Security Studies is a peer-reviewed quarterly academic journal covering international relations published by Routledge that was established in 1991. The current editor-in-chief is Randall Schweller (Ohio State University). According to the Journal Citation Reports, the journal has a 2017 impact factor of 1.778.

Along with International Security, it is the most prominent journal dedicated to security studies.

See also
List of scholarly journals in international relations

References

External links 
 

International relations journals
Publications established in 1991
Security studies
Taylor & Francis academic journals
Quarterly journals
English-language journals